Gymnopilus longisporus is a species of mushroom in the family Hymenogastraceae.

See also

List of Gymnopilus species

External links
Gymnopilus longisporus at Index Fungorum

longisporus
Fungi of North America
Taxa named by William Alphonso Murrill